The 2007 Basilan beheading incident was an armed incident in July 2007 between the Moro Islamic Liberation Front (MILF) rebels and the Philippine Army which led to the execution of 14 or 23 members of the Philippine Marines, amongst them 11 beheaded in the province of Basilan in the southern Philippines.

Background

On June 10, 2007, Italian priest Giancarlo Bossi of the Pontifical Institute for Foreign Missions (PIME) was kidnapped in Payao, Zamboanga Sibugay province. His captors were believed to be renegade MILF members or Abu Sayyaf.

His captors have released photographs of Bossi as alive and well, but failed to communicate with the Philippine government negotiators about any demands. Early operations of the Armed Forces of the Philippines were concentrated on Zamboanga Sibugay, in the belief that the captors had not left the province.

Bossi survived the kidnapping.

Operations in Basilan

On July 10, 2007, according to MILF chief negotiator Mohagher Iqbal, violence broke out at Tipo-Tipo, Basilan, a known Moro region, when Marines entered the town. Lieutenant Col. Ariel Caculitan, spokesman for the Philippine Marines, said the death toll of the Marines was 23 (some document say the location of the encounter was at Al-Barka a new municipality established by Islamic soldiers at Tipo-Tipo).

During the firefight, which lasted a day, at least 20 armed militants were killed, and seven others were wounded. MILF soldiers which later scoured the area after the firefight found 11 headless corpses of Marines. Aside from the beheaded remains, MILF forces recovered "27 firearms were recovered from the scene. These are: six M60 machine guns; eight M203 grenade launchers, 10 M-16 Armalite rifles, a 60-mm mortar, and several night vision goggles".

Brigadier General Ramiro Alivio, chief of 1st Marine Brigade, said that aside from the MILF, the guerrillas consisted of Abu Sayyaf, and other rebel groups.

However, the Philippine Army said the Abu Sayyaf were not present in the region where Bossi was captured. The official government death toll was 14, although Philippine newspapers says 23 soldiers were dead on the Marines' side.

The Moro Islamic Liberation Front stated "the Marines entered the MILF territory in the town of Tipo-Tipo in complete disregard of the ceasefire agreement between the Moro Islamic Liberation Front, and the Philippine government".

Reaction
Matthew Lussenhop, United States press attaché in Manila, remarked that "It's a tragic incident. The United States embassy condoles with the families of killed, and wounded soldiers although it's still not clear to us what really happened".

References

2007 murders in the Philippines
History of Basilan
Hostage taking in the Philippines
Islamic terrorist incidents in 2007
Islamism-related beheadings
July 2007 events in Asia
Moro conflict
Terrorist incidents in the Philippines in 2007